The 2011 Royal Rumble was the 24th annual Royal Rumble professional wrestling pay-per-view (PPV) event produced by World Wrestling Entertainment (WWE). It was held for wrestlers from the promotion's Raw and SmackDown brand divisions. The event took place on January 30, 2011, at the TD Garden in Boston, Massachusetts. As has been customary since 1993, the Royal Rumble match winner received a world championship match at that year's WrestleMania. For the 2011 event, the winner received their choice to challenge for either Raw's WWE Championship or SmackDown's World Heavyweight Championship at WrestleMania XXVII. This was the last Royal Rumble held under the first brand extension, which ended in August, but was reinstated in July 2016.

Four matches were featured on the event's supercard, a scheduling of more than one main event. The main event was the 2011 Royal Rumble match, which featured 40 participants from both brands instead of the usual number of 30—it has thus far been the only Royal Rumble match to have 40 participants. It was won by SmackDown's Alberto Del Rio, who last eliminated Raw's Santino Marella. The primary match on the Raw brand was for the WWE Championship, between reigning champion The Miz and Randy Orton, which Miz won to retain the title. The primary match on the SmackDown brand was Edge versus Dolph Ziggler for the World Heavyweight Championship, which Edge won to retain the title. The other featured match on the card was a fatal-four way match for the WWE Divas Championship in which Natalya defended the title against Eve Torres, Layla, and Michelle McCool; Torres won to win the championship.

Production

Background
The Royal Rumble is an annual gimmick pay-per-view (PPV), produced every January by World Wrestling Entertainment (WWE) since 1988. It is one of the promotion's original four pay-per-views, along with WrestleMania, SummerSlam, and Survivor Series, dubbed the "Big Four". It is named after the Royal Rumble match, a modified battle royal in which the participants enter at timed intervals instead of all beginning in the ring at the same time. The 2011 event was the 24th event in the Royal Rumble chronology and was scheduled to be held on January 30, 2011, at the TD Garden in Boston, Massachusetts. It featured wrestlers from the Raw and SmackDown brands.

The Royal Rumble match generally features 30 wrestlers, but for 2011, the match was instead scheduled to have 40 participants. Traditionally, the winner of the match earns a world championship match at that year's WrestleMania. For 2011, the winner could choose to challenge for either Raw's WWE Championship or SmackDown's World Heavyweight Championship at WrestleMania XXVII.

Storylines 
The card consisted of four matches, as well as one dark match. The matches resulted from scripted storylines, where wrestlers portrayed heroes, villains, or less distinguishable characters to build tension and culminated in a wrestling match or series of matches. Results were predetermined by WWE's writers on the Raw and SmackDown brands, with storylines produced on their weekly television shows, Raw and SmackDown.

In addition to the Royal Rumble match, the main rivalry from the Raw brand involved the WWE Champion The Miz defending his title against Randy Orton. The night after Survivor Series, The Miz cashed in his Money in the Bank contract and defeated Orton to become the WWE Champion before successfully defending it against Orton a month later at TLC: Tables, Ladders and Chairs. After defeating Wade Barrett and Sheamus, in a steel cage match on an episode of Raw, Orton received another opportunity at the title in a match against The Miz.

The main rivalry from the SmackDown brand involved the World Heavyweight Champion Edge defending his title against Dolph Ziggler. After defeating "Dashing" Cody Rhodes, Drew McIntyre and The Big Show, Ziggler won a title opportunity for Edge's World Heavyweight Championship after Kane lost to Edge in his rematch. After winning his opportunity, Edge went on a campaign against Ziggler and his girlfriend, Edge's ex-wife, Vickie Guerrero. On the January 28 episode of SmackDown,  Vickie Guerrero, who was the acting General Manager in place of the injured Theodore Long, banned the use of the spear and would strip him of his title if he was caught using it during his match against Ziggler.

The Divas rivalry entering the Royal Rumble was between Natalya and LayCool over the Divas Championship. Natalya defeated LayCool in a handicap match at Survivor Series to win the Divas Championship, and she would later team with Beth Phoenix in defeating LayCool in a Divas tag team Tables Match at TLC. On the December 20 edition of Raw, Melina turned heel after defeating Eve Torres and Alicia Fox in a #1 Contender's Triple Threat Match, when she slapped Natalya after the match. On the January 24, 2011 edition of Raw, Natalya successfully defended the title against Melina, and after the match ended, LayCool entered and announced that they will cash in their rematch clause at the Royal Rumble event.

Event

Preliminary matches
The event opened with Edge defending the World Heavyweight Championship against Dolph Ziggler, with the stipulation that Edge would lose the World Heavyweight Championship should he use the Spear. Edge applied the Edgecator on Ziggler but Ziggler touched the ring ropes, forcing Edge to break the hold. Ziggler performed a Leg Drop Bulldog on Edge for a near-fall. Ziggler applied a Sleeper Hold on Edge but Edge escaped and performed an Edgecution on Ziggler. Edge pinned Ziggler but Vickie Guerrero pulled the referee, voiding the pinfall at a two count. Whilst Kelly Kelly attacked Guerrero, Ziggler performed a Zig Zag on Edge for a near-fall. Ziggler applied another Sleeper Hold on Edge but Edge collided with the referee, allowing Edge to perform a Spear on Ziggler. Edge performed a Killswitch on Ziggler to retain the title.

Next, The Miz defended the WWE Championship against Randy Orton. During the match, Orton attempted an RKO but Miz countered and attempted a Skull Crushing Finale but Orton countered and performed an Olympic Slam on The Miz. The Miz retrieved the WWE Championship belt and attempted to walk away but Orton performed a Clothesline on Miz. Orton performed an Elevated DDT on Miz and The Nexus appeared. Whilst the referee was distracted by The Nexus, Orton threw Alex Riley onto the Nexus and the referee. Orton performed an RKO on Miz but Punk performed a GTS on Orton. When the referee recovered, Miz pinned Orton to retain the title.

After that, Natalya defended the WWE Divas Championship against Layla and Michelle McCool and Eve Torres in a Fatal 4-Way match. Natalya applied a Double Sharpshooter on Eve and Layla but McCool performed a Big Boot on Natalya. McCool attempted another Big Boot on Natalya but Natalya avoided the move, resulting in McCool performed a Big Boot on Layla. Eve performed a Diving Moonsault on Layla to win the title.

Main event

The main event was the 40-man Royal Rumble match for a world championship match at WrestleMania XXVII. CM Punk entered at #1 but was attacked by Nexus's rivals The Corre. The anonymous RAW General Manager stopped the attack and threatened to disqualify both the Corre and the Nexus from the Royal Rumble match. United States Champion Daniel Bryan then entered at #2 and the match began. Punk would last the longest in the match for over 35 minutes and scored seven eliminations, throwing Bryan, John Morrison, Mark Henry (with the assistance of The Nexus), Chris Masters, Tyler Reks, WWE Tag Team Champion Vladimir Kozlov and R-Truth over the top rope.

Booker T was a surprise entrant at #21 but his return was only short-lived as he was eliminated by Mason Ryan after performing his signature moves, the Scissors Kick on David Otunga, the Book End on Michael McGillicutty and his signature taunt, the Spinaroonie. John Cena entered next and eliminated all the Nexus members, Cena would eventually tie CM Punk with seven eliminations. Diesel was another surprise entrant at #32 but he was eliminated by Wade Barrett. Alex Riley was mistakenly eliminated early by Kofi Kingston and John Cena. Riley was supposed to help eliminate Cena later in the match, but The Miz would do it by himself instead, with a distraction from Riley. After Alex Riley was eliminated, WWE Champion The Miz, who joined commentary during Riley's performance, interfered in the match and eliminated Cena. Wade Barrett, WWE Tag Team Champion Santino Marella, Alberto Del Rio and Randy Orton were now the final four.

Orton eliminated Barrett but was quickly thereafter eliminated by Del Rio who was wrongly declared the winner. After the bell rang, the referees realized that Santino Marella (entered at #37) was never eliminated. When Sheamus hit him with a Big Boot, Marella rolled under the bottom rope and out of the ring where he stayed until the assumed end of the match. Marella then re-entered the ring, the match was restarted and Del Rio got struck by Marella's Cobra. Marella prematurely celebrated his victory and went for the elimination but Del Rio managed to roll out of the way, pull down the top rope and eliminate Marella to finally win the match. This Royal Rumble match was the longest in its history until the 50-men Royal Rumble match at WWE Greatest Royal Rumble in 2018.

Reception
Royal Rumble received positive reviews, most notably from Arda Ocal and Jim Korderas of Right After Wrestling on SIRIUS Radio 98, who called it one of the best Royal Rumble matches in recent memory. 
SLAM! Wrestling writers Dale Plummer and Nick Tylwalk shared similar compliments to the event, praising the short, though crowd-pleasing appearances of Kevin Nash and Booker T. Overall, they also awarded the event a score of 8.5/10. The event received 476,000 buys, up from the previous year's 465,000.

Aftermath
In April 2011, the promotion ceased using its full name with the "WWE" abbreviation becoming an orphaned initialism. In August, the brand split was dissolved, thus the 2011 Royal Rumble was the last Royal Rumble held during the first brand extension. However, the brand split would be reinstated in July 2016. Additionally, the 2011 Royal Rumble has thus far been the only Royal Rumble to have a 40-man Royal Rumble match. Only one other Royal Rumble match has had more participants, which was the 50-man Greatest Royal Rumble match held at the Greatest Royal Rumble event in April 2018. Although similar and although the match had the same rules, it is not part of the Royal Rumble's PPV chronology.

Results

Royal Rumble entrances and eliminations
 
 – Raw
 – SmackDown
 – Unsigned (hof)
 – Winner

 The Miz was not a participant in the Royal Rumble match.

References

External links
 Official website

2011
Events in Boston
Entertainment events in Boston
2011 in Boston
Professional wrestling in Boston
2011 WWE pay-per-view events
January 2011 events in the United States